Daley Blind (born 9 March 1990) is a Dutch professional footballer who plays as a defensive midfielder, left-back or centre-back for Bundesliga club Bayern Munich and the Netherlands national team. He is the son of former Ajax defender and former Netherlands national team manager Danny Blind.

Blind rose through the youth ranks at Ajax, becoming a regular after a loan to Groningen, and won four consecutive Eredivisie titles with the club. In September 2014, he transferred to Manchester United for £13.8 million, where he was part of the team that won four trophies including the FA Cup, EFL Cup and UEFA Europa League. In the summer of 2018, Blind returned to Ajax, where he won his fifth Eredivisie title and first-ever KNVB Cup in his first season back at the club.

A full international since 2013, Blind has earned over 90 caps and was a member of the Dutch squad that finished third at the 2014 FIFA World Cup. He has since featured at UEFA Euro 2020 and the 2022 World Cup.

Club career

Ajax
Blind began his career in the youth academy of his hometown club, Ajax; the same club where his father Danny made his name as a professional. Blind is a product of the Ajax youth system and, while officially still a B-junior, he became a mainstay in the A-juniors during the 2007–08 season. before earning promotion to the Ajax first-team for the 2008–09 season. He was a midfielder through his journey up the Ajax youth levels, often playing the 'No. 6' or 'third centre-back' role. He showed good promise as a youngster and was made captain of Jong Ajax in 2007. He signed his first professional contract at the age of 17, tying him to the club until 1 July 2010.

On 7 December 2008, Blind made his debut in the Ajax first-team in the away match against FC Volendam. Blind made an immediate impact when he forced a corner kick through a Volendam defender, from which Jan Vertonghen scored the winning goal for Ajax. On 19 December 2008, he signed a contract extension keeping him with Ajax until 30 June 2013.

Loan to Groningen
On 5 January 2010, he joined Groningen on loan for the remainder of the 2009–10 season, during the winter transfer window. At Groningen, Blind was mainly used as a right-back. He was almost sold to Groningen for €1.5 million by Ajax on a permanent basis but the move did not materialize.

Back from loan spell

The following two seasons saw Blind contribute to two Eredivisie national championships with Ajax, for the 2010–11 season, and the 2011–12 season, the first of which would be Ajax's 30th championship title. However, Blind's performances when given the chance were unconvincing and he was even booed off the field in an Eredivisie game. Under newly appointed manager Frank de Boer, Blind would be given more and more trust and playing time, earning him the place as the first choice left-back with a permanent starting position during the 2012–13 season.

On 23 April 2013, it was announced by Marc Overmars that Ajax and Blind had reached an agreement to extend his contract for three years, binding him to the club until the summer of 2016. On 5 May, Blind contributed to Ajax's third Dutch Eredivisie title in a row, marking the club's 32nd national title, helping to defeat Willem II 5–0 at home, and securing the top position on the table just one match day from season's end. Later that day it was announced that Blind had been declared AFC Ajax Player of the Year for the 2012–13 season, after playing an outstanding fifth year for Ajax, from the starting left-back position.

During the 2013–14 season, De Boer moved Blind back to his natural defensive central midfielder position and was named Dutch Footballer of the Year as Ajax won a fourth consecutive league title.

Manchester United

On 30 August 2014, Manchester United reached an agreement to sign Blind, subject to a medical and agreement of personal terms. The transfer was completed on 1 September 2014, for a fee of £13.8 million.

Blind made his debut 13 days after his signing, playing the full 90 minutes as United beat Queens Park Rangers 4–0 at Old Trafford for their first victory of the season. His first goal for the club came on 20 October, a 20-yard strike that earned United a 2–2 draw at West Bromwich Albion.

On 16 November, Blind sustained a knee ligament injury in the Netherlands' UEFA Euro 2016 qualifier against Latvia which kept him out of the Manchester United team for the remainder of 2014. On 11 January 2015, Blind returned to the United team, starting in defence in a 1–0 loss to Southampton at Old Trafford. On 8 February, he scored an injury-time equaliser for United in a 1–1 draw against West Ham.

Although throughout the previous season Blind was used as a defensive midfielder or left-back, Blind started the season as a centre-back, where he played for the majority of the season. On 12 September 2015, he scored his first goal of the season in a 3–1 win against Liverpool at Old Trafford, also being named man of the match for his performance.

He began the 2016–17 Premier League season as first choice center-back alongside Chris Smalling, however, lost his place in the team following a return to form of Phil Jones and Marcos Rojo. He worked his way back to the first-team, but featured mostly at left-back, replacing first choice left-back Luke Shaw. He scored his first goal of the season against Sunderland on Boxing Day, charging into the box to connect with a pass from Zlatan Ibrahimović and finishing low into the bottom corner. He started the Europa League final against his former team Ajax, which Manchester United won 2–0.

Return to Ajax
On 17 July 2018, both Manchester United and Ajax announced they had agreed a transfer for Blind to return to Ajax for a four-year deal and a fee of €16 million with conditional add-ons. On 16 December 2018, Blind scored his first senior hat-trick, in an 8–0 league win over De Graafschap at home, whilst playing as a centre-back.

In August 2020, Blind collapsed during a pre-season friendly and was due for medical exams before returning to training. 

On 27 December 2022, Blind and Ajax mutually terminated his contract and Blind left the club as a free agent.

Bayern Munich
On 5 January 2023, Blind joined Bundesliga club Bayern Munich on a contract until the end of the season.

International career

Youth
Blind was called up to the Netherlands under-17 squad for 2007 European Championships. After missing out the opening match through suspension, he scored a brace against Iceland in the second match but picked up an ankle injury in that match that ended his participation in the remainder of the tournament. He was called up to the under-21 team for several 2011 European Championship qualifiers but did not leave the bench. On 13 October, he made his first appearance in the campaign, coming on as a substitute for Ajax teammate Siem de Jong in a 4–0 win away at Poland.

Senior
Having had previous call-ups, Blind made his debut for the Netherlands senior team on 6 February 2013, in the starting left-back position, against Italy in a friendly encounter at the Amsterdam Arena. The match ended in a 1–1 draw, with Blind playing the full 90 minutes.

In June 2014, he was selected in the Netherlands squad for the 2014 FIFA World Cup. He was a starter at left wing-back for the team's opening match against Spain, assisting goals for Robin van Persie and Arjen Robben, as the Oranje won 5–1. He scored his first goal for the Netherlands in a 3–0 defeat of Brazil in the third-place play-off. He would later score in a friendly against Mexico later that year.

He was selected for teams played in the UEFA Euro 2020 and 2022 FIFA World Cup. He scored his first goal for the Netherlands in eight years in the latter competition's round of 16 win over the United States.

Personal life 
He is the son of former Ajax defender and former Netherlands national team manager Danny Blind. His wife gave birth to their son in October 2019.

Health 
On 21 December 2019, it was revealed Blind had been diagnosed with myocarditis, and had been fitted with an implantable cardioverter-defibrillator.

Career statistics

Club

International

Scores and results list Netherlands goal tally first, score column indicates score after each Blind goal.

Honours
Ajax
Eredivisie: 2010–11, 2011–12, 2012–13, 2013–14, 2018–19, 2020–21, 2021–22
 KNVB Cup: 2018–19, 2020–21
Johan Cruyff Shield: 2013, 2019

Manchester United
FA Cup: 2015–16
EFL Cup: 2016–17
FA Community Shield: 2016
UEFA Europa League: 2016–17
UEFA Super Cup runner-up: 2017

Netherlands
 FIFA World Cup third place: 2014
 UEFA Nations League runner-up: 2018–19

Individual
Ajax Talent of the Future (Sjaak Swart Award): 2007–08
Ajax Player of the Year (Rinus Michels Award): 2012–13
Dutch Footballer of the Year: 2014
Eredivisie Team of the Year : 2012–13, 2013–14, 2018–19   
Amsterdam's Player of the Year (De Fanny): 2014
UEFA Europa League Squad of the Season: 2016–17
UEFA Nations League Finals Team of the Tournament: 2019

References

External links

Profile at fcbayern.com
Netherlands U15 stats at OnsOranje
Netherlands U16 stats at OnsOranje
Netherlands U17 stats at OnsOranje
Netherlands U19 stats at OnsOranje
Netherlands U21 stats at OnsOranje
Daley Blind at Voetbal International 

1990 births
Living people
21st-century Dutch people
Footballers from Amsterdam
Dutch footballers
Association football fullbacks
Association football midfielders
Association football utility players
AFC Ajax players
FC Groningen players
Manchester United F.C. players
FC Bayern Munich footballers
Eredivisie players
Eerste Divisie players
Premier League players
Bundesliga players
UEFA Europa League winning players
Netherlands youth international footballers
Netherlands under-21 international footballers
Netherlands international footballers
2014 FIFA World Cup players
UEFA Euro 2020 players
2022 FIFA World Cup players
Dutch expatriate footballers
Dutch expatriate sportspeople in England
Expatriate footballers in England
Dutch expatriate sportspeople in Germany
Expatriate footballers in Germany
FA Cup Final players